(born 19 July 1956 as ) is a former sumo wrestler from Sakai, Osaka, Japan. He made his professional debut in March 1972, and reached the top division in November 1980. His highest rank was komusubi. He retired in July 1988 and became an elder in the Japan Sumo Association under the name Tagonoura. He left the Sumo Association in August 1999. He is the father of the current sekitori wrestler of the same name, Sadanoumi Takashi.

Career record

See also
Glossary of sumo terms
List of past sumo wrestlers
List of komusubi

References

1956 births
Living people
Japanese sumo wrestlers
Sumo people from Osaka Prefecture
People from Sakai, Osaka
Komusubi